Boalkhali is an upazila of Chattogram District in Chattogram Division, Bangladesh.

Geography
It previously had 33514 households and its total area is 145.44 km2.

According to the 2001 Bangladesh Census, there were 36,588 households.

Demographics
As of the 1991 Bangladesh census, Boalkhali has a population of 195607. Males constitute 51.75% of the population, and females 48.25%. This Upazila's eighteen up population is 98116. Boalkhali has an average literacy rate of 48.5% (7+ years), and the national average of 32.4% literate.

As of the 2001 Bangladesh census, the population was 201,590, comprising 104,601 males and 96,989 females.
Boalkhali had 9 Unions, 31 Mauza and 30 villages and the literacy rate was 71.8%.

Economy
Agriculture and manufacturing are the two major economic sectors in Boalkhali. The main crops grown here are Paddy, Mustards, Onion, Garlic, Chili and other vegetables. The KorolDenga hills are very fertile for cultivating fruits. The main fruits cultivated here are Jackfruit, Mango, Olive, Papaya, Guava, Kamranga, Banana, KoshshoGula, FyinnaGula, Boththa, Aamra, Pineapple, Lemon and Jambura. The main trees planted in the Koroldenga hills are Agar, Rubber and Teak. The bank of Karnafuli River is also very fertile for cultivation. There are so many fisheries, dairies and poultries in Boalkhali Upazila.

There are a lot of Hats and Bazars in Boalkhali. Hazir Hat, Chowdhury Hat, Munsi Hut, Jomadar Hat etc. are famous Bazar.

The transportation of Boalkhali Upazila is very developed compare to other parts of the country. People can navigate through Karnafuli River, Rail, Bus, Tempoo, CNG (Local Taxi). For Rail there are two stations one in Gomdandi and another one in Bengura.

Administration
Boalkhali Upazila is divided into Boalkhali Municipality and nine union parishads: Ahla Karaldenga, Amuchia, Charandwip, Kandhurkhil, Paschim Gamdandi, Popadia, Sakpura, Saroatali, and Sreepur Kharandwip. The union parishads are subdivided into 31 mauzas and 33 villages.

Boalkhali Municipality was formed by nine wards in 2012 and is located by the whole Former East Gondandi Union, West Gomdandi unit 1 to 6 and Khadurkhil unit 1 to 3 from Union Parishod.

Mayor
 Haji Abul Kalam (Abu) Bangladesh National Party

Upazila Chairman: 
 Mohammad Nurul Amin, Bangladesh Awami League

Vice Chairman: 
 Mohammad Selim, Bangladesh Awami League

Woman Vice Chairman: 
 Shamim Ara Begum, Bangladesh Awami League

Upazila Nirbahi Officer (UNO):
 Mohammad Mamun

Notable residents
Abdul Wahid Bengali (1850-1905), theologian, teacher and social reformer
Binod Bihari Chowdhury, revolutionary, was born at Uttar Bhurshi village in 1911.
Kalpana Datta, revolutionary, was born at Sreepur village in 1913. 
Shefali Ghosh, singer, was born at Kanungo Para village circa 1941.
Rama Chowdhury-War heroine of Bangladesh Liberation war.
Chinmoy Kumar Ghosh - Philosopher, Peace Meditations at the United Nations 1931

See also
 Upazilas of Bangladesh
 Districts of Bangladesh
 Divisions of Bangladesh

References

Upazilas of Chittagong District